Outcast is the eighth studio album by German thrash metal band Kreator. It was released by G.U.N. Records in 1997. This album featured more gothic and industrial influences than earlier Kreator, retaining little of the thrash metal from previous years. Outcast is also Kreator's first album to feature drummer Jürgen "Ventor" Reil since 1992's Renewal, and the first to feature then-former Coroner guitarist Tommy Vetterli.

Release
In March 2018, German record label Noise Records released a remastered edition of the album and made it available on CD and vinyl and as digital download. The release contains a live performance of Kreator at Dynamo Open Air in 1998 and liner notes.

Track listing

Personnel

Kreator
 Mille Petrozza – vocals, rhythm guitar, programming
 Tommy Vetterli – lead guitar, programming
 Christian Giesler – bass
 Jürgen Reil – drums, programming

Additional musicians
 Christian Loeunhoff – woodblock
 Guido Eickelmann – programming

Production
 Kreator – production
 Vincent Wojno – producer with Kreator, engineer
 Britta Kühlmann – engineer
 Vincent Sorg – assistant engineer, programming
 Jörg Umbrett, Sascha Kramski – assistant engineers
 Romald Prent – mixing at Wisseloord Studios, Hilversum, Netherlands
 Joerg Steineadt – mixing assistant
 Dirk Rudolph – sleeve design
 Harald Hoffmann – cover photos

2018 reissue technical personnel
 Steve Hammond – compilation
 Andy Pearce, Matt Worthams – mastering
 Thomas Ewerhard, Jan Meininghaus – art and design
 Harald Hoffmann – additional photos
 Malcolm Dome  – sleeve notes
 Olman Viper – live mastering

Charts

References

Kreator albums
1997 albums
GUN Records albums
Industrial metal albums
Gothic metal albums by German artists